Patrick Reilly (1909–1999) was a British diplomat.

Patrick Reilly may also refer to:
 Paddy Reilly (born 1939), Irish folk singer and guitarist
 Paddy Reilly (Gaelic footballer), Gaelic football player
 Paddy Reilly (soccer player), Irish soccer player at the 1924 Olympic Games 
 Pat Reilly (1873–1937), football manager
 Pat Reilly (mayor), Australian mayor of the City of Willoughby, Sydney
 Come Back, Paddy Reilly, to Ballyjamesduff (1912), song written by Percy French (1854–1920)

See also
Patrick Riley (disambiguation)